Sebastian Colloredo  "Sebo" or "Collo" (born 9 September 1987 in Gemona del Friuli), is an Italian ski jumper who has competed since 2002. Competing in two Winter Olympics, he earned his best finish of 11th in the team large hill event at Turin in 2006 while his best individual finish was 27th twice (individual normal hill: 2006, individual large hill: 2010).

Career
Colloredo's best individual finish was 10th in the individual large hill in Innsbruck in 2017.

Further notable results
 2003: 3rd, Italian championships of ski jumping
 2004: 1st, Italian championships of ski jumping
 2005:
 1st, Italian championships of ski jumping
 1st, Italian championships of ski jumping, large hill
 2006:
 1st, Italian championships of ski jumping
 2nd, Italian championships of ski jumping, large hill
 2007:
 1st, Italian championships of ski jumping
 Italian championships of ski jumping, large hill
 2008:
 1st, Italian championships of ski jumping
 Italian championships of ski jumping, large hill
 2009:
 1st, Italian championships of ski jumping
 Italian championships of ski jumping, large hill
 2010:
 1st, Italian championships of ski jumping
 Italian championships of ski jumping, large hill
 2011:
 1st, Italian championships of ski jumping
 Italian championships of ski jumping, large hill

References

External links
 

1987 births
Living people
Italian male ski jumpers
Ski jumpers at the 2006 Winter Olympics
Ski jumpers at the 2010 Winter Olympics
Ski jumpers at the 2014 Winter Olympics
Ski jumpers at the 2018 Winter Olympics
Olympic ski jumpers of Italy
People from Gemona del Friuli
Sportspeople from Friuli-Venezia Giulia